A wireless identification and sensing platform (WISP) is an RFID (radio-frequency identification) device that supports sensing and computing: a microcontroller powered by radio-frequency energy.  
That is, like a passive RFID tag, WISP is powered and read by a standard off-the-shelf RFID reader, harvesting the power it uses from the reader's emitted radio signals. To an RFID reader, a WISP is just a normal EPC gen1 or gen2 tag; but inside the WISP, the harvested energy is operating a 16-bit general purpose microcontroller. The microcontroller can perform a variety of computing tasks, including sampling sensors, and reporting that sensor data back to the RFID reader. WISPs have been built with light sensors, temperature sensors, and strain gauges.  Some contain accelerometers. 
WISPs can write to flash and perform cryptographic computations. The WISP was originally developed by Intel Research Seattle, but after their closure development work has continued at the Sensor Systems Laboratory at the University of Washington in Seattle.

Implementation 

The WISP consists of a board with power harvesting circuitry, demodulator, modulator, microcontroller, external sensors, and other components such as EEPROM and LED.

Applications 

WISPs have been used for light level measurement, acceleration sensing, cold chain monitoring (passive data logging), and cryptography and security applications.

See also 
 Indian Institute of Remote Sensing
 Intel Research Lablets
 Remote sensing in mobile telecommunications
 NODE platform
 Quality control system (QCS) for web and papers
 SWARM
 Wireless sensor network nodes

References

External links
 
 
 

 

Wireless sensor network
Ubiquitous computing
Automatic identification and data capture
Radio-frequency identification